Anthology of Modern Serbian Lyric is an anthology published in 1911 by Matica hrvatska in Zagreb, Austria-Hungary (modern day Croatia). The foreword for this book was written by Bogdan Popović. It was the first attempt to create a literary canon of the most significant poems down the ages. The book contains poems by authors including Jovan Jovanović Zmaj, Laza Kostić, Petar I Petrović-Njegoš, Vojislav Ilić, Jovan Grčić Milenko, Aleksa Šantić, Jovan Dučić, Milan Rakić, Sima Pandurović and Veljko Petrović. The book has undergone several editions, including translations into Slovene in 1965. In 2011, Srpska književna zadruga, a member of the Board for Standardization of the Serbian Language, published the 100th anniversary edition.

References

1911 poetry books
1911 anthologies
Serbian poetry
Serbian books
Poetry anthologies
20th century in Zagreb
History of the Serbs of Croatia